"Voodoo People" is a song by British electronic music group the Prodigy, released on 12 September 1994 as the third single from their second studio album, Music for the Jilted Generation (1994), and as their eighth single overall. It was released as a 12-inch single and in EP format in the United States in 1995 through Mute Records. The guitar riff, based on "Very Ape" by Nirvana, is played by Lance Riddler.

Critical reception
Spence Dookey from the Gavin Report remarked that "Voodoo People" "unleashes fiery fuzztronics that blaze and smolder amidst autobahn speed chase rhythms and red alert sirens." Columnist James Masterton wrote, "The new single has little of the commercial charm or potential of that last hit ("No Good (Start the Dance)"), but its a creditable chart performance nonetheless." Maria Jimenez from Music & Media complimented it as a "superb break-beat track". 

Andy Beevers from Music Week gave it five out of five, adding that "this is one of their most accessible tracks with its rock guitar riffs and flute flurries." Dele Fadele from NME felt that "Voodoo People" "likens the rave scenario to a black magic ritual. With The Prodigy as witchdoctor, of course." Brad Beatnik from the RM Dance Update wrote, "It's a sort of Jethro Tull-goes-hardcore and the result is a brilliant slice of uncompromising yet defiantly commercial techno." Another editor, James Hamilton, described it as "psychedelic guitar and flute prodded flurrying tribal techno".

Music videos
The original music video for "Voodoo People", directed by Walter Stern and Russell Curtis, was filmed on location in Saint Lucia and featured Leeroy Thornhill as a voodoo priest. This version included scenes featuring real witch doctors, but these were cut because of problems with television censorship. A number of other more graphic versions of the video are available, one of them appearing in the Prodigy's Electronic Punks documentary.

Remixes and covers
The British release included a remix by the Chemical Brothers.

The song has been covered by Refused and British funk band 6ix Toys as well remixed by Pendulum (see Voodoo People (Pendulum Remix)) and other known and less known artists such as Eskimo, Alvaro and Shayning. Croatian cello duo 2Cellos have recorded an instrumental version for their album In2ition and have been performing it live on their subsequent tour.

Track listing
UK 12-inch vinyl

US 12-inch vinyl

Benelux CD single

CD single

North American EP

Charts

Weekly charts

Year-end charts

Certifications

References 

The Prodigy songs
1994 singles
XL Recordings singles
Songs written by Liam Howlett
Music videos directed by Walter Stern
1994 songs
Number-one singles in Finland